Macalla niveorufa is a species of snout moth in the genus Macalla. It was described by George Hampson in 1906. It is found in Panama.

References

Moths described in 1906
Epipaschiinae